The Nova Scotia Utility and Review Board or NSUARB is the independent tribunal and regulating arm of the Government of Nova Scotia.

NSUARB was established in 1992 following the amalgamation of the former Board of Commissioners of Public Utilities, the Nova Scotia Municipal Board, the Expropriations Compensation Board and the Nova Scotia Tax Review Board.  It is governed under the Utility and Review Board Act.  NSUARB reports directly to the Nova Scotia House of Assembly, currently through the Minister of Finance.

NSUARB's responsibilities are quite broad and cover the following issues:

 automobile insurance
 electricity rates for Nova Scotia Power and other electrical utilities
 gaming
 Halifax-Dartmouth Bridge Commission
 liquor licensing
 motor carrier division - buses
 natural gas
 payday loans
 petroleum product pricing
 railways
 municipal water and sewer rates
 municipal electoral district boundaries

See also
 Prince Edward Island Regulatory and Appeals Commission

External links
NSUARB - official website

Nova Scotia government departments and agencies